My Villain Heart is an EP record by the Northern Ireland-based artist Duke Special. The record was released on Medieval Haircut Records in 2004, and features six tracks.

Track listing
Last Night I Nearly Died (But I Woke Up Just in Time)
Some Things Make Your Soul Feel Clean
Regarding the Moonlight in Eastbourne
Wake Up Scarlett
You Don’t Slow Me Down
Love is a Series of Scars

All songs were written by Duke Special. The tracks were subsequently also released on the 2005 album Adventures in Gramophone.

External links
Description page on Duke Special's website

2004 EPs
Duke Special albums